Sergey Alekseyevich Kuznetsov (born 12 May 1966) is a Russian professional football coach and a former player. He made his professional debut in the Soviet Second League in 1984 for FC Spartak Tambov. Kuznetsov is the first Russian to play in the Bulgarian A PFG.

Honours
 Russian Premier League runner-up: 1993.

References

Soviet footballers
Russian footballers
Russian Premier League players
FC Spartak Tambov players
FC SKA Rostov-on-Don players
FC Rotor Volgograd players
FC Energiya Volzhsky players
PFC Krylia Sovetov Samara players
Russian expatriate footballers
Expatriate footballers in Finland
Expatriate footballers in Bulgaria
1966 births
Footballers from Tambov
Living people
Russian expatriate sportspeople in Bulgaria
First Professional Football League (Bulgaria) players
Association football defenders
TP-47 players